Shot may refer to:

Arts, entertainment, and media
Shot (album), by The Jesus Lizard
Shot, Illusion, New God, an EP by Gruntruck
Shot Rev 2.0, a video album by The Sisters of Mercy
"Shot" (song), by The Rasmus
Shot (2017 film), an American film starring Noah Wyle
Shot (filmmaking), a part of a film between two cuts

Organizations
Serious Hazards of Transfusion, or SHOT, an organisation monitoring blood transfusion errors in the UK
Society for the History of Technology, or SHOT, a professional organization for historians of technology

Sports
Shot (ice hockey), an attempt to score a goal or points
Home run, or shot in baseball slang
Shot put, an event in track and field athletics
SHOT Show (Shooting, Hunting, and Outdoor Trade Show), an annual trade show for the shooting, hunting, and firearms industry
Cricket shots, ways of hitting the ball to score in cricket

Weaponry and ballistics
Shot (pellet), small balls of metal generally used as shotgun projectiles, or as weights
Armor-piercing shot and shell, an artillery shell
Buckshot, a type of shotgun projectiles
Gunshot, discharge of a firearm
Round shot, a spherical solid metal projectile
Sho't, main battle tank

Other uses
Shot, a slang term for an injection (medicine).
Shot, a fifteen fathom line length of anchor chain
 Shot, or shott, a group of adjacent strips or furlongs in the medieval open field system
 Shot, or shooter (drink), a mixed alcoholic drink served in a shot glass
Shot glass, a small glass used for serving or measuring liquor
Shot silk, a type of silk
Showt or Shoţ, a city in Iran

See also
 The Shot (disambiguation)
 Moonshot (disambiguation), a rocket launch to the moon
 Shots (disambiguation)
 Shoot (disambiguation)
 Shooter (disambiguation)
 Shooting (association football), a kicking technique in association football
 Shooting, the act of firing a projectile weapon or device